The 2021 Biathlon European Championships were held from 27 to 31 January 2021 in Duszniki-Zdrój, Poland. It was also a stage of the 2020–21 Biathlon IBU Cup.

Schedule
All times are local (UTC+1).

Results

Men's

Women's

Mixed

Medal table

References

2021
2021 in biathlon
2021 in Polish sport
International sports competitions hosted by Poland
Biathlon competitions in Poland
IBU